Ricky's All Day Grill is a restaurant chain in western Canada. The restaurant was founded in 1960 as a family breakfast house. The first location in eastern Canada opened in Peterborough, Ontario in November 2007.

History 
Al Sheren opened the first Ricky's, naming the chain after his son, Ricky.  This was Ricky's Pancake House & Chicken and it opened in the early 1960s in Park Royal Shopping Centre in West Vancouver, BC. Park Royal had just opened and it was the first indoor mall in Canada.

Roy Hildebrand bought a franchise in 1979 and became the franchisor in 1982. Roy and his family quickly expanded the chain, opening locations throughout Western Canada.

Frank Di Benedetto acquired Ricky's in 1997 as majority owner, President and CEO. Ricky's All Day Grill. Ricky's is now open for breakfast, lunch and dinner.

Ricky's All Day Grill has become one of the fastest growing mid-scale family restaurants in Canada with 67 locations.

See also
 List of pancake houses
 List of Canadian restaurant chains

References

External links
 

Regional restaurant chains in Canada
Restaurants in British Columbia
Companies based in Burnaby
Restaurants in Saskatchewan
Restaurants in Alberta
Restaurant chains in Canada
Pancake houses
Restaurant franchises